State Trunk Highway 174 (Highway 174, STH-174, or WIS 174)  was a state highway in the US state of Wisconsin. It traveled northeast from WIS 31 in Pleasant Prairie to WIS 50 in Kenosha.

Route description
Starting at WIS 31, WIS 174 ran northeastward via Springbrook Road. After crossing Kenosha's city limit, WIS 174 transitioned onto 22nd Avenue. Eventually, it ended at WIS 50 (75th Street).

History
In 1947, WIS 174 was formed, superseding County Trunk Highway Y (CTH-Y) in Kenosha in the process. During its existence, there were no significant changes to it. In 1990, WIS 174 was decommissioned and replaced with CTH-ML.

Major intersections

Reference

174
Transportation in Kenosha County, Wisconsin